The Watch 1505  (also named PHN1505 or Pomander Watch of 1505) is the world's first watch. It was crafted by the German inventor, locksmith and watchmaker Peter Henlein from Nuremberg, during the year 1505, in the early German Renaissance period, as part of the Northern Renaissance. However, other German clockmakers were creating miniature timepieces during this period, and there is no definite evidence Henlein was the first. It is the oldest watch in the world that still works. The watch is a small fire-gilded copper sphere, an oriental pomander, and combines German engineering with Oriental influences.
In 1987, the watch reappeared at an antiques and flea market in London. The initial price estimation for this watch is between 50 and 80 million dollars (May 2014).

History

Nuremberg 
The years between 1470 and 1530 are generally considered as the heyday (Blütezeit) of the city of Nuremberg. In that time, the city became a center of craft, science and humanism. The new worldview of the Renaissance took hold in the Bavarian city.
During the Middle-Ages, Nuremberg grew under the Hohenstaufen and Luxembourgers to become one of the most important cities in the Holy Roman Empire. One main reason for this was that Nuremberg was one of the two trading centers on the route between Italy and northern Europe. Thanks to this advantage, as well as burgeoning craftsmanship and long-distance trade, the city became wealthy.
Based on this wealth, political, religious, artistic, cultural and technological aspects developed that would make Nuremberg one of the most important cultural centers of the Renaissance north of the Alps, and a center of humanism and Reformation.

A popular quote about the Nuremberg Esprit (spirit of Inventions = Nürnberger Witz) from this time is: Nuremberg jokes and frills are known throughout the world. Another well-known saying at the time of the Holy Roman Empire positioned the various different European centers of the age, including Nuremberg’s special atmosphere:
“If I had Venice’s power, Augsburg’s splendor, Nuremberg’s esprit, Strasburg’s weapons and Ulm’s money, I would be the richest man in the world.”

Watch Invention 
The first timepieces to be worn, made in the 16th century initially in the German cities of Nuremberg and Augsburg, were transitional in size between clocks and watches.
Portable timepieces were made possible by the invention of the mainspring. Peter Henlein was the first German craftsman to make ornamental timepieces worn as pendants, which were the first timepieces to be worn on the body. His fame (as  the inventor of the watch) is based on a passage by Johann Cochläus in 1511.
Since then, Henlein is generally known as the inventor of the first portable watches.
In the early 16th century, he became the first to install small movements in the capsule of a pomander with olfactory essences. 
In 1505, Peter Henlein of Nuremberg was the first to build the portable pomander watch, the first watch of the world.

The production of this watch was made possible primarily by a previously unseen scale of miniaturization of the torsion pendulum and coil spring mechanism, placed in a technical unit by Peter Henlein, a technological innovation and novelty of the time, operating in all positions.

Henlein created the pomander watch while he lived in the Franciscan Monastery in Nuremberg, where he gained knowledge of the Oriental world gathered over centuries, Henlein acquired the new techniques and tools which helped him creating the first watch in the form of a gilt pomander.

In his lifetime, Henlein created other or similar types of watches (e.g., drum watches - the later called the Nuremberg eggs). He also crafted a tower clock for Lichtenau castle in 1541, and was known as a maker of sophisticated scientific instruments.

Rediscovery 
The story of the watch's reappearance began in 1987, at an antique-flea market in London. The watch sequentially changed ownership between collectors who were unaware of its actual worth, until in 2002 a private collector purchased the pomander watch.
A committee assessed the watch in 2014, particularly the assertion that the pomander dates back to 1505, and was signed by Henlein himself.

Aesthetics 
The design consisted of two small half-spheres, joined by a binding hinge. The upper half of the pomander can be opened to reveal a second – slightly smaller – half-sphere underneath. The top of that inner sphere shows the dial. The upper surface of the dial shows Roman numbers for the first half of the day, and on the outer side of the dial Arabic numerals for the second half of the day. This shows the transition to the new use of numerals at this time in history.

The pomander watch displays small engravings of the city of Nuremberg at the beginning of the 16th century, e. g. the Henkerturm built in the year 1320, which can still be visited today or the still standing Weinstadel, which also still stands. Other symbols are also engraved on the watch, such as sun, serpents or laurels engraved on the watch.

Technical description 
The casing consists of copper, fire gilded on the outside and fire silver-plated on the inside of the watch. Apart from a renewed brass sprocket, the movement is made completely of iron. The detailed dimensions are:

 Casing diameter: 4.15 cm x 4.25 cm (with equator ring 4.5 cm) - Weight 38.5 g
 Movement diameter: 3.60 cm x 3.55 cm - Weight: 54.1 g

A key is used to wind up the watch movement. The Watch 1505 produces a calculated running time of 12 hours.

Inscriptions 
On the watch housing, an old Latin banner is engraved. The inscription is: DVT ME FUGIENT AGNOSCAM R. The possible two translations are:

 1505 - The time will escape me (Henlein), but I (the watch) will recognize the correct time 
 In the year 1505 – My watches will flee (run), and recognize the correct time.

The letters „MDV PHN“ are engraved under the examined silver plating and were found on the inside of the casing underneath the outer face of the clock. The hypothetical indication of the engraving is: 1505 Peter Henlein Nuremberg.
Tiny PH-letters, often smaller than half a millimeter, were also found. Peter Henlein was a locksmith and had no qualification as a watchmaker, as there were none (there was no existing occupation or guild).  He was not allowed to sign his work officially, as he was not a member of the locksmith's guild.  In the early days of watchmaking, locksmiths often were involved in the production as they were accustomed to making small metal components.

Symbolism of the watch 

The Pomander(derived from the French pomme ‘ambre in German Bisamapfel) also called Riechapfel, was a status symbol from the Orient, and often represented first encounter by the Europeans with the fragrances of the Orient. It became as a valued symbolic gift of diplomatic exchange between leading personalities in from the East to the West, and was believed to have a healing and protective effect. For example Jacob Cornelisz. van Oostsanen created 1518 a portrait of Jan Gerritz van Egmond van de Dijenborgh, the elected major of Alkmaar, in 1518, with a pomander in his hand. The pomander form was spread in the Middle Ages from the Orient throughout Europe.  The watch itself can be seen as a cultural encounter between the European engineering and the Oriental form. Pomanders were worn due to the poor hygienic conditions in the cities. The musk-perfume inside the pomander had a disinfectant and odor resistant effect.

The serpent is one of the oldest mythological symbols in civilization, going back as far as the Summer in Mesopotamia. The serpent eating its own tail (the Ouroboros) is a symbol for the infinity of the universe and the eternal life. It also represents the orbit of the sun, duality, and an Ancient Egyptian alchemist symbol (The All is one).

The symbolism of the laurel passed over into Roman culture, which held laurels as a symbol of victory. It is also associated with immortality, with ritual purification, prosperity and health.

The symbolism of the sun on the pomander, as the source of energy and light for life on earth has been a central object in culture and religion since prehistory. Ritual solar worship has given rise to solar deities in theistic traditions throughout the world, and solar symbolism is ubiquitous. Apart from its immediate connection to light and warmth, the sun is also important in timekeeping as the main indicator of the day and the year.

Financial worth 
A paper from 1524 records that Heinlein was paid 15 florins (one florin is approximately between 140 and 1000 modern US dollars) for a gilt pomander watch. 
The initial price estimation is around 50 - 80 million dollars, according to the AntiqueWeek magazine (May 2014).

Examinations and confirmation 

Several examinations (micro- and macro-photographic and metallurgical examinations, as well as a 3D computer tomography)  were made to proof the authenticity of the watch. The general examinations-result showed that the pomander watch was created by Henlein in the year 1505.

There is also a confirmation of the date of invention, verifying that the engravings lie beneath under the layer of a medieval method of fire gilding. The invention was celebrated at the 400th anniversary of the German Watchmakers’ Association in 1905. On this occasion, a monument fountain dedicated to Peter Henlein was built in Nuremberg.

Also Johann Neudörfers also wrote in 1547 that Henlein invented the pomander watches (die bisam Köpf zu machen erfunden).

The Walhalla in Donaustauf, which is a memorial for "politicians, sovereigns, scientists and artists of the German tongue", honors Peter Henlein with the words inventor of the watch.

Other pomander watches by Peter Henlein 

Nowadays, there are only two preserved pomander watches in the world. The one from 1505 is in private ownership, and the Pomander Watch of Melanchthon, from 1530, which is owned by the Walters Art Museum in Baltimore. It was most probably a gift by the City of Nuremberg, to the Nuremberg Reformer Philipp Melanchthon and Peter Henlein was commissioned to create this personalized watch. Also an empty housing of a pomander watch can be found at the Wuppertal Watch Museum.

The former watchmaker and art collector Jürgen Abeler from the Wuppertaler Watch Museum concludes about pomander watches in his book: „So if any one of the preserved watches at all should be linked with the person of Peter Henlein, it can only be this watch in the pomander.“

Historical influences of the watch 
The systemized knowledge of the earliest-known civilization of the Sumer, such as  systemized knowledge of astronomical calculations and mathematics (sexagesimal number system for measuring time, geographical coordinates and angels, 60 second minute and 60 minute hour, 360 degrees etc.) was safeguarded and further developed ancient knowledge and scientific process during the Golden Age of Islam, leading to the perfection of mechanical clocks and the first watch invention in Nuremberg, a process covering a broad historical stretch of time.

One of the first culture-historical encounter of the Europeans with technology from the Orient was a mechanical water clock from the Abbasid Caliph of Bagdad Harun Al-Rashid (ruled 786 – 809 CE) sent as one of the gifts to the Holy Roman Emperor Charlemagne on the occasion of his coronation in 800 CE, in Aachen The House of Wisdom, an intellectual center in the Caliphates Capital of Baghdad and the Islamic Golden Age started influencing the world civilization and its discoveries, by starting to translate (Translation Movement) and developing ancient knowledge and its discoveries, from one of the most influential texts of all time, Almagest by Ptolemy (AD 100-170), to the influential The Book of Knowledge of Ingenious Mechanical devices by the Muslim polymath Ismail al-Jazari in 1206, describing 100 mechanical devices.

The widespread network of the Muslim Caliphates interconnected with the world's known trade routes, mainly the Silk Road from China to the Caliphate of Cordoba and Al-Andalusian Spain, were not only the most important trade routes but also networks of knowledge transfer. The broad network made it necessary to have primarily navigation devices, such as astrolabes, which were introduced to Europe from Muslim Spain in the early 12th century. The Andalusian engineer Ibn Khalaf al-Muradi wrote the technological manuscript Kitāb al-asrār fī natā'ij al-afkār (The Book of Secrets in the Results of Thoughts). The manuscript provides information about a "Castle and Gazelle Clock" and many other forms of complicated clocks and ingenious devices.

The astronomer and mathematician of the German Renaissance, Regiomontanus who was influenced by the year of Italian Renaissance environment went to Nuremberg and verifiably influenced the circle of humanists and scholars around Peter Henlein. He is famous for building the first observatory in Germany, in Nuremberg. During Peter Henlein’s time at the Franciscan Monastery of Nuremberg, it supported many different scholars and very learned personalities. For example, the monk Friedrich Krafft built a complicated Astrologium in this monastery.  Thus Peter Henlein the inventor of the watch not only came into contact with new techniques and tools, but also with a spiritual and intellectual environment of craftsmanship.
The earliest medieval European clockmakers were Catholic monks.

The attempt to make clocks smaller and portable was always a challenge for clockmakers, Peter Henlein is not the inventor of portable clocks, but rather of wearable time measurement; the watch, the smallest personalized timekeeping device of his time. By combining an Oriental status symbol, the pomander (or fragrance apple), with a miniaturized watch movement, his invention changed the way we measure and manage time. Historically, the watch was crafted at the same time Leonardo da Vinci painted Mona Lisa.

See also 

 Peter Henlein
 Pomander watch
 Nuremberg eggs
 Watch
 History of watches
 History of timekeeping devices
 Nürnberg
 List of German inventions and discoveries
 German Renaissance
 Renaissance
 Pomander

Literature 
 Ernst von Bassermann-Jordan: Alte Uhren und Ihre Meister, page 47 - 51, publisher: Wilhelm Diebener Leipzig, 1926. German, 
 Catherine Cardinal: Die Zeit an der Kette, page 16, publisher: Klinkhardt & Biermann Munich, 1985. German, 
 Thomas Eser: Die älteste Taschenuhr der Welt?, publisher: Verlag des Germanischen Nationalmuseums, 2014. German, 
 Samuel Guye, Henri Michael: Uhren und Messinstrumente, Orell Füssli Verlag Zürich, 1970. German, 
 Maren Winter: Die Stunden der Sammler, Heyne, 2004. German, 
 Jürgen Abeler: In Sachen Peter Henlein, Wuppertaler Uhrenmuseum, Wuppertal 1980. German, 
 Walter Spiegel: Taschenuhren, Mosaik, Munich 1981. German, 
 Hans Dominik: Das ewige Herz - Meister Peter Henleins Nürnberger Oerlein, Wilhelm Lippert Berlin, 1942. German, 
 Thomas Eser: Die älteste Taschenuhr der Welt? Der Henlein-Uhrenstreit. Nürnberg 2014. German,  (Digitalisat)

References 
Footnotes

Citations

External links 

Clock designs